Samuel David Saunders (December 17, 1905 – September 30, 2005) was an American politician in the state of Florida.

Saunders was born at Penney Farms, Florida in 1905 to Mary Ann Conway and McQueen Saunders. He was a rancher from Green Cove Springs, Florida. He served in the Florida House of Representatives from 1949 to 1964 (Clay County).

References

1905 births
2005 deaths
People from Green Cove Springs, Florida
Democratic Party members of the Florida House of Representatives
People from Penney Farms, Florida
20th-century American politicians